The Bishop's Gaiters women's basketball team represent Bishop's University in the RSEQ Conference of U Sports women's basketball. The program has captured the Bronze Baby twice, achieving the feat in back-to-back years (1983–84).

History
The 1982–83 season would result in the Gaiters first national championship. After losing in the Bronze Baby championship game in 1981 and 1982, the Gaiters went undefeated in league play during the regular season. Winning all three games in the National Championship, the path towards an elusive title began with a convincing 77–40 triumph over the University of New Brunswick.

Followed by a semi-final victory versus the OUA champion Brock Badgers women's basketball by a 60-42 margin, the national championship game saw them tip off versus the dynastic Victoria Vikes women's basketball program. Besting them in a convincing 64–49 final, Andrea Blackwell earned the tournament's Most Valuable Player nod.

Following up their emotional championship run in 1983, the Gaiters maintained the momentum for the next campaign. With only two regular season losses in 1983–84, the Gaiters were dominant in their first two games at the National Championships.

Defeating the Manitoba Bisons by a remarkable 32 points, prevailing by an 89-57 tally, the Gaiters met the Brock Badgers for the second consecutive time in the semis. Prevailing in a convincing 60-42 outcome, the University of Winnipeg awaited in the Finals. Going back-to-back with a 70–62 defeat of Winnipeg, Andrea Blackwell and Lynn Polson shared Tounrmanet MVP honours.

Qualifying for the postseason in 2012, the Gaiters would not reach the RSEQ Playoffs until 2018. During the 2017–18 season, Edith Noblecilla finished as the Gaiters’ leading scorer, averaging 12.8 points per game, which ranked sixth in the conference. Pacing all players in the conference with 5.4 assists per game, ranking among the top players nationally, she would also emerge as the conference leader with 2.1 steals per game. By season's end, she was recognized as the Bishop's Gaiters Female Athlete of the Year.

International
Debbie Huband : Basketball at the 1984 Summer Olympics
Andrea Blackwell : Basketball at the 1984 Summer Olympics
Lynn Polson  : Basketball at the 1984 Summer Olympics, won a bronze medal for Canada at the 1986 FIBA World Championship for Women
Cynthia Johnston : Played for Canada in Basketball at the 1996 Summer Olympics
Victoria Gauna : 2021 FIBA Women's AmeriCup

Awards and honors
Cynthia Johnston: Greater Saint John Sports Hall of Fame (2021 inductee)

University Awards
2017-18 Bishop's Gaiters Female Athlete of the Year: Edith Noblecilla 
2019-20 Bishop's Gaiters Female Athlete of the Year: Amaiquen Siciliano

Gaiters Wall of Distinction
Inducted in 1995: Debbie Huband
Inducted in 1998: Andrea Blackwell
Inducted in 2000: 1982-83 Women's Basketball Team
Inducted in 2000: 1983-84 Women's Basketball Team
Inducted in 2003: Ann Fitzgerald
Inducted in 2004: Lynn Polson
Inducted in 2008: Sue Hylland
Inducted in 2008: Nancy Knowlton
Inducted in 2016: Cynthia Johnston

Team awards

Rookie of the Year
2005-06:
2006-07: 
2007-08:
2008-09:
2009-10:
2010-11:
2011-12:
2012-13:
2013-14:
2014-15: 
2015-16: Ashley Milhomme
2016-17: Metchline Gabelus
2017-18: Marie-Evrardine Berrouette
2018-19: Amaiquen Siciliano
2019-20: Jael Kabunda

Nancy Knowlton Team Award
2005-06: Carly Clarke and France Lanoie and Josianne Lafreniere
2006-07: Christelle Cote
2007-08: Christelle Cote
2008-09: Robyn Wilson
2009-10: Robyn Wilson
2010-11: Melanie Ouellet Godcharles
2011-12: Catherine Belanger-Paquet
2012-13: Danielle Lumley
2013-14: Danielle Lumley
2014-15: Danielle Lumley
2015-16: Maude Archmbault
2016-17: Eva Kuhar
2017-18: Maude Archambault
2018-19: Marie Berrouette   
2019-20: Maeva Courla     

Most Improved Player
2005-06:
2006-07:
2007-08:
2008-09:
2009-10:
2010-11:
2011-12:
2012-13:
2013-14: Genevieve Onyeka 
2014-15: Ashely White
2015-16: Charlene Pettigrew
2016-17: Mara Marchizotti
2017-18: Metchline Gabelus
2018-19: Sarah Peirson 
2019-20: Sabrina Kone  

Most Valuable Player
2001-02: Melissa Lemay
2002-03: Catherine Charbonneau
2003-04: Anouk Boulanger
2004-05: Anouk Boulanger
2005-06: Emile Crofton
2006-07: Laure Pitfield
2007-08: Melanie Ouellet-Godcharles and Jessy Roy
2008-09: Melanie Ouellet-Godcharles and Jessy Roy
2009-10: Melanie Ouellet-Godcharles and Katy Germain
2010-11: Jessy Roy
2011-12: Jessy Roy
2012-13: Gabrielle Chamberland 
2013-14: Danielle Lumley
2014-15: Edith Noblecilla
2015-16: Noemie Hamel-Petit
2016-17: Edith Noblecilla
2017-18: Edith Noblecilla 
2018-19: Metchline Gabelus   
2019-20: Amaiquen Siciliano

RSEQ Awards
2017-18 RSEQ Coach of the Year: Craig Norman

Rookie of the Year
2019-20 RSEQ Rookie of the Year: Jael Kabunda
2002-03: Anouk Boulanger
1996-97 Cynthia Hitchcock
1994-95: Nicky Walsh

RSEQ All-Stars
First Team
2019-20: Jael Kabunda

Second Team

All-Rookie Team
2019-20 Deborah Aboagaye
2019-20 Jael Kabunda
2019-20 Jennifer Louis
2018-19 Amaiquen Siciliano
2017-18: Marie Berrouette
2016-17: Metchline Gabelus
2015-16: Ashley Milhomme
2015-16: Charlene Pettigrew
2014-15: Noemie Hamel-Petit
2013-14: Mara Lis Marchizotti
2013-14: Naomie Zitt-James
2011-12: Veronique Fortin-Tremblay
2011-12: Eloisa Katz
2010-11: Gabrielle Chamberland
2010-11: Bailey Trafford
2009-10: Bethan Chalke

Statistical Leaders
1971-72 QUAA now known as RSEQ Scoring leader: Nancy Knowlton
1972-73 QUAA Scoring leader: Nancy Knowlton

U Sports Awards 
2019-20 Kathy Shields Award: Jael Kabunda
2003-04 Coach of the Year: Craig Norman
1983-84 Peter Ennis Award: Wayne Hussey
1983-84 Nan Copp Award: Andrea Blackwell 
1980-81 Peter Ennis Award: Wayne Hussey

U Sports championship MVP
1983-84 (tie) Andrea Blackwell and Lynn Polson 
1982-83 Andrea Blackwell 
1977-78 Debbie Huband

All-Canadians
1980-81 All-Canadian: Sue Hylland
1982-83 All-Canadian: Andrea Blackwell
1982-83 All-Canadian: Lynn Polson
1983-84 All-Canadian: Andrea Blackwell
1983-84 All-Canadian: Lynn Polson

Top 100
In celebration of the centennial anniversary of U SPORTS women's basketball, a committee of U SPORTS women's basketball coaches and partners revealed a list of the Top 100 women's basketball players. Commemorating the 100th anniversary of the first Canadian university women's contest between the Queen's Gaels and McGill Martlets on Feb. 6, 1920, the list of the Top 100 was gradually revealed over four weeks. Culminating with the All-Canadian Gala, which also recognized national award winners.

References

U Sports women's basketball teams
Basketball teams in Quebec
Women in Quebec
Bishop's University